West Bishop is a census-designated place (CDP) in Inyo County, California, United States. The population was 2,607 at the 2010 census, down from 2,807 at the 2000 census.

Geography

Demographics

2010
The 2010 United States Census reported that West Bishop had a population of 2,607. The racial makeup of West Bishop was 2,373 (91.0%) White, 10 (0.4%) African American, 28 (1.1%) Native American, 45 (1.7%) Asian, 1 (0.0%) Pacific Islander, 72 (2.8%) from other races, and 78 (3.0%) from two or more races. Hispanic or Latino of any race were 261 persons (10.0%).

The Census reported that 2,607 people (100% of the population) lived in households, 0 (0%) lived in non-institutionalized group quarters, and 0 (0%) were institutionalized.

There were 1,133 households, out of which 261 (23.0%) had children under the age of 18 living in them, 714 (63.0%) were opposite-sex married couples living together, 70 (6.2%) had a female householder with no husband present, 48 (4.2%) had a male householder with no wife present.  There were 33 (2.9%) unmarried opposite-sex partnerships, and 5 (0.4%) same-sex married couples or partnerships. 257 households (22.7%) were made up of individuals, and 146 (12.9%) had someone living alone who was 65 years of age or older. The average household size was 2.30.  There were 832 families (73.4% of all households); the average family size was 2.66.

The population was spread out, with 455 people (17.5%) under the age of 18, 135 people (5.2%) aged 18 to 24, 399 people (15.3%) aged 25 to 44, 957 people (36.7%) aged 45 to 64, and 661 people (25.4%) who were 65 years of age or older.  The median age was 52.6 years. For every 100 females, there were 97.2 males.  For every 100 females age 18 and over, there were 96.0 males.

The homeowner vacancy rate was 1.0%; the rental vacancy rate was 4.2%.  2,208 people (84.7% of the population) lived in owner-occupied housing units and 399 people (15.3%) lived in rental housing units.

2000
As of the census of 2000, there were 2,807 people, 1,143 households, and 883 families residing in the CDP. The racial makeup of the CDP was 91.98% White, 0.07% Black or African American, 1.21% Native American, 1.10% Asian, 0.04% Pacific Islander, 4.10% from other races, and 1.50% from two or more races.  7.70% of the population were Hispanic or Latino of any race.

There were 1,143 households, out of which 28.1% had children under the age of 18 living with them, 69.2% were married couples living together, 6.2% had a female householder with no husband present, and 22.7% were non-families. 19.6% of all households were made up of individuals, and 8.8% had someone living alone who was 65 years of age or older.  The average household size was 2.45 and the average family size was 2.81.

In the CDP, the population was spread out, with 22.9% under the age of 18, 3.9% from 18 to 24, 19.8% from 25 to 44, 33.7% from 45 to 64, and 19.6% who were 65 years of age or older.  The median age was 47 years. For every 100 females, there were 97.0 males.  For every 100 females age 18 and over, there were 94.8 males.

The median income for a household in the CDP was $57,163, and the median income for a family was $63,446. Males had a median income of $51,429 versus $28,077 for females. The per capita income for the CDP was $27,386.  About 4.5% of families and 6.2% of the population were below the poverty line, including 7.5% of those under age 18 and 2.8% of those age 65 or over.

Politics

References

Census-designated places in Inyo County, California
Bishop, California
Owens Valley
Populated places in the Sierra Nevada (United States)
Census-designated places in California